Louis Betts (October 5, 1873 – August 13, 1961) was an American portrait painter.

Biography
Betts was born in Little Rock, Arkansas. His father was an artist who remarried after Louis' mother died. His family moved to Chicago where his three younger siblings were born. Betts was able to continue his study of art as did his siblings.

Betts studied with William Merritt Chase at the Pennsylvania Academy of Fine Arts in 1894, worked in Chicago and New York, and was made a full member of the National Academy of Design by 1915.  He died in 1961.

References

Bibliography
Michael Huey Dearie — The Louis Betts Portrait of Harriet King Huey, Schlebrügge, Vienna 2011.

External links

 Biographical Notes, a catalog of American artists containing additional information on Betts (page 7).
 
 

1873 births
1961 deaths
Artists from Little Rock, Arkansas
19th-century American painters
American male painters
20th-century American painters
Members of the Salmagundi Club
19th-century American male artists
20th-century American male artists
Members of the American Academy of Arts and Letters